Robert Weber (April 21, 1934 – November 1, 2008) was an American gridiron football player and coach. He served as the head football coach at the University of Arizona from 1969 to 1972 and at the University of Louisville from 1980 to 1984, compiling a career college football head coaching record of 36–61.

Weber grew up on a farm near Fort Collins, Colorado and played center at Colorado State University from 1951 to 1954, earning all-Skyline Conference honors his final two years. After college, he played in the Canadian Football League (CFL) with the Edmonton Eskimos for a year before a water skiing injury ended his playing career. Weber began his coaching career at Trinidad State Junior College before becoming an assistant coach at Colorado State University.

Following his time at the University of Louisville, Weber served as an assistant coach at Southern Methodist University and Vanderbilt University before retiring in the mid-1990s. Weber died of pancreatic cancer on November 1, 2008.

Head coaching record

College

References

1934 births
2008 deaths
American football centers
American players of Canadian football
Arizona Wildcats football coaches
Colorado State Rams football coaches
Colorado State Rams football players
Edmonton Elks players
Kansas State Wildcats football coaches
Louisville Cardinals football coaches
Ottawa Rough Riders coaches
SMU Mustangs football coaches
Vanderbilt Commodores football coaches
Junior college football coaches in the United States
Sportspeople from Fort Collins, Colorado
Coaches of American football from Colorado
Players of American football from Colorado